John Horncastle (or John de Horncastle) was a Bishop of Carlisle. He was elected about 10 January 1353 but was never consecrated as his election was quashed about 26 June 1353.

Citations

References
 

Bishops of Carlisle
14th-century English people